Elections to Lancashire County Council were held in May 1993.

This was the last election at which Blackburn with Darwen and Blackpool participated in Lancashire elections.

Results

Blackburn

Blackpool

Burnley

Chorley

Fylde

Hyndburn

Lancaster

Pendle

Preston

Ribble Valley

Rossendale

South Ribble

West Lancashire

Wyre

References

1993
1993 English local elections
1990s in Lancashire